Henry Wildman Kettlewell (20 July 1876 – 28 April 1963) was an English cricketer. He was a right-handed batsman and right-arm fast bowler who played for Somerset. He was born and died in East Harptree.

Having played for Eton College between 1893 and 1895, Kettlewell made a single first-class appearance for the team during the 1899 season, against Hampshire. Kettlewell scored a single run in the first innings in which he batted, and 6 not out in the second.

Kettlewell took figures of 0-30 in the eight overs in which he bowled.

External links
Henry Kettlewell at Cricket Archive 

1876 births
1963 deaths
English cricketers
Somerset cricketers